Painted Church may refer to several Hawaiian churches that were decorated with religious scenes:

 St. Benedict's Catholic Church, commonly called simply "The Painted Church"
 Star of the Sea Painted Church